A Group Called Smith is the debut album by American rock band Smith, released in 1969. It contains their biggest hit, a cover version of the Shirelles' song, "Baby, It's You", which peaked at No. 5 on the Billboard Hot 100 on November 1, 1969 (spending a total of 15 weeks on the chart). "Baby, It's You" was used in Quentin Tarantino's 2007 film, Death Proof.

The album reached No. 17 on the Billboard 200 chart.

Track listing
Titles and songwriting credits from original album sleeve and AllMusic.

 "Let's Get Together" (Chet Powers) – 3:32
 "I Don't Believe (I Believe)" (Jeffrey Thomas) – 3:41
 "Tell Him No" (Rod Argent) – 3:27
 "Who Do You Love" (Bo Diddley) – 2:57
 "Baby, It's You" (Burt Bacharach/Mack David/Luther Dixon (credited as Barney Williams)) – 3:27
 "Last Time" (Mick Jagger/Keith Richards) – 5:38
 "I Just Want to Make Love to You" (Willie Dixon) – (Muddy Waters cover) – 2:38
 "Mojaleskey Ridge" (Harvey Price/Joel Sill/Dan Walsh) – 2:32
 "Let's Spend the Night Together" (Mick Jagger/Keith Richards)– 3:54
 "I'll Hold Out My Hand" (Al Gorgoni/Chip Taylor) – 3:06

1994 reissue
 "Let's Get Together" (Chet Powers) – 3:32
 "I Don't Believe (I Believe)" (Jeffrey Thomas) – 3:41
 "Tell Him No" (Rod Argent) – 3:27
 "Who Do You Love" (Bo Diddley) – 2:57
 "Baby, It's You" (Burt Bacharach/Mack David/Luther Dixon (credited as Barney Williams)) – 3:27
 "Last Time" (Mick Jagger/Keith Richards) – 5:38
 "I Just Want to Make Love to You" (Willie Dixon) – 2:38
 "Mojaleskey Ridge" (Harvey Price/Joel Sill/Dan Walsh) – 2:32
 "Let's Spend the Night Together" (Mick Jagger/Keith Richards) – 3:54
 "I'll Hold Out My Hand" (Al Gorgoni/Chip Taylor) – 3:06
 "The Weight (Robbie Robertson) – (The Band cover, originally released on the Easy Rider soundtrack) – 4:32
 "Take a Look Around" (Jerry Carter/Rick Cliburn) – 2:54
 "What Am I Gonna Do" (Carole King/Toni Stern) – (also performed by Kenny Rogers) – 2:55
 "Gonna Be Alright Now" (Dennis Lambert/Brian Potter) – (Gayle McCormick solo single) – 2:50
 "It's a Cryin' Shame" (Dennis Lambert/Brian Potter) – (Gayle McCormick solo single) – 2:49

Singles chart positions
Billboard Hot 100 –
 "What Am I Gonna Do" - #73
 "Take a Look Around" - #43
 "Baby It's You" - #5

References 

1969 debut albums
Dunhill Records albums
Soul albums by American artists